Susan Elaine "Sue" Bradley-Kameli (born September 17, 1956 in Toronto, Ontario) is a retired Canadian hurdler who specialized in the 100 metres hurdles.

Susan went on to have an exciting running career where she finished sixth at the 1975 Pan American Games and won the bronze medal at the 1982 Commonwealth Games. She also competed at the 1976 Olympic Games, the 1983 World Championships and the 1984 Olympic Games without reaching the final.
Susan also made the 1980 Canadian Olympic team. 
She became Canadian champion in 1974, 1980, 1982 and 1983. Her personal best time was 13.10seconds, achieved in 1983.

References

External links
 
 
 
 
 

1956 births
Living people
Athletes from Toronto
Canadian female hurdlers
Athletes (track and field) at the 1976 Summer Olympics
Athletes (track and field) at the 1984 Summer Olympics
Olympic track and field athletes of Canada
Athletes (track and field) at the 1975 Pan American Games
Athletes (track and field) at the 1983 Pan American Games
Pan American Games track and field athletes for Canada
Athletes (track and field) at the 1982 Commonwealth Games
Commonwealth Games bronze medallists for Canada
Commonwealth Games medallists in athletics
World Athletics Championships athletes for Canada
Medallists at the 1982 Commonwealth Games